The National Union of Independents (UND) was a conservative political party in Monaco led by Joseph Simon.

History
The UND was established following a financial scandal in 1955 when the Societe Monégasque de Banque was bankrupted, holding a significant amount of government funds. It won 11 of the 18 seats in the National Council in the 1958 elections. In 1962 it merged with the National Democratic Entente to form the National Democratic Union, which won 17 seats in the 1963 elections.

Ideology
A conservative party, the UND called for constitutional reforms, an expansion of political rights and government accountability.

References

Defunct political parties in Monaco
Monarchist parties in Monaco
Political parties disestablished in 1962